Irina Mikhaylovna Elcheva (28 November 1926 – 8 May 2013) was a Russian composer. She studied at Mussorgsky College and the Leningrad Conservatory. She collected folk songs and completed the opera Spartak in 1962.

Elcheva died in St. Petersburg on 8 May 2013, at the age of 86.

References

External links
500 Operas by Women, Women’s Philharmonic Advocacy

1926 births
2013 deaths
20th-century classical composers
20th-century women composers
21st-century classical composers
21st-century women composers
Russian opera composers
Russian women classical composers
Soviet composers
Women opera composers